Hughes-Hallett may refer to several people with the surname:

Charles Hughes-Hallett (1898-1985), British Royal Navy officer.
Deborah Hughes Hallett, mathematics education reformer
Francis Hughes-Hallett (1838–1903), British politician.
James Hughes-Hallett (1949-2019), British businessman and investor.
John Hughes-Hallett (1901-1972), British politician.
Kathleen Hughes-Hallett (1918-2002), Canadian fencer.
Lucy Hughes-Hallett (born 1951), British cultural historian and biographer.
Norton Hughes-Hallett (1895–1985), British army officer and cricket player.
Sir Thomas Hughes-Hallett (born 1954), British barrister, investment banker and philanthropy executive.